Willie Mays Aikens (born October 14, 1954) is an American professional baseball first baseman who played in Major League Baseball for the California Angels, Kansas City Royals, and Toronto Blue Jays between 1977 and 1985. He had established himself as one of the top sluggers in the game before drugs derailed his career. In 1994, Aikens was sentenced to 20 years in prison on four counts of crack cocaine distribution and one count of use of a firearm during drug trafficking. He was released on June 4, 2008, after changes in federal drug laws, and is sometimes cited as an example of the results of mandatory maximum sentencing in drug-related crimes.

Early years
Aikens grew up in poverty in the Bruce Hill community of Seneca, South Carolina. He was a standout athlete in baseball, football and basketball at Seneca High School, and attended historically black South Carolina State University on a baseball and football scholarship. When S.C. State dropped baseball after Aikens' freshman year, Willie McNeil, Aikens' high school baseball coach, helped him catch on with a semi-professional summer baseball league in Baltimore, Maryland. While playing in Baltimore, he caught the attention of California Angels scout Walter Youse and was selected by the Angels with the number two overall pick in the January  MLB draft.

MLB career

California Angels

He began the 1977 season at the Angels Triple-A affiliate in Salt Lake City where he hit 14 home runs and with a strong .336. batting average. He was called up to the Angels major league roster at the end of the Minor League season in September where in 91 at-bats in 42 games he hit a very unimpressive .198 and failed to hit his first major league home run.

He batted .280 with 21 home runs and 81 RBIs his rookie season.

Kansas City Royals
The Angels traded Aikens and Rance Mulliniks to the Kansas City Royals for Al Cowens and Todd Cruz at the Winter Meetings on December 6, 1979, with Craig Eaton being sent to California to complete the transaction four months later on April 1, 1980. Aikens inherited the first base job upon his arrival in Kansas City despite not being a very good fielder (he committed a league-leading 12 errors in ). Recovering from knee surgery, he got off to a slow start but hit well in the second half of the season. He finished second to George Brett on his team in both home runs and RBIs with 20 and 98, respectively. The Royals won their division by 14 games to face the New York Yankees in the American League Championship Series for the third time in four years. After having come up short in 1976, 1977 and 1978, the Royals swept the Yankees in three games in the 1980 American League Championship Series to face the Philadelphia Phillies in the World Series.

Aikens hit two home runs in Game 1 (his 26th birthday) and Game 4 of the  World Series. He also collected the game-winning RBI in the tenth inning of Game 3, the Royals' first-ever win of a World Series game. Aikens batted .400, but the Royals lost the World Series in six games.

Aikens led the Royals in both home runs and RBIs in the strike shortened  season. His Royals returned to the postseason, but were swept by the Oakland Athletics in the 1981 American League Division Series. For his part, Aikens batted .333 (three for nine) and also reached base three times via base on balls. However, he failed to score or drive in any runs.

Toward the end of the 1983 season, Aikens and several of his Royals teammates were questioned by U.S. attorney Jim Marquez in connection with a federal cocaine probe. Following the season, Aikens, Jerry Martin and Willie Wilson pleaded guilty to attempting to purchase cocaine, while former teammate Vida Blue pleaded guilty to possession of three grams of cocaine. Aikens, Blue, Martin and Wilson were all sentenced to three months in prison.

Toronto Blue Jays
Shortly after Aikens' November 17 sentencing, the Royals traded him to the Toronto Blue Jays for designated hitter Jorge Orta. Aikens was originally suspended by Baseball Commissioner Bowie Kuhn for a year. Following a May 15,  review, he was reinstated. In 93 games, Aikens hit 11 home runs and drove in 26.

The Blue Jays released Aikens a month into the  season, and re-signed him to a minor league contract. In his final major league at bat, on April 27, Aikens hit a pinch-hit two-run home run in the ninth inning to tie the ballgame—the Blue Jays won the game in the tenth inning. Nevertheless, Aikens was let go and despite a healthy .311 batting average and 16 home runs with the Syracuse Chiefs, he never returned to the majors. He played four games for the New York Mets' AAA affiliate, the Tidewater Tides in  before heading to Mexico to join the Mexican Pacific League's Yaquis de Obregón.  Aikens played for six years in the Mexican League, where he was regularly among the league's top hitters; he batted .454 in 1986, one of the highest single-season averages in professional baseball history.

Arrest

Aikens was called to testify in the Pittsburgh drug trials of Curtis Strong as his major league career was winding down. His legal problems continued after his retirement, culminating in his being found guilty of selling  of crack cocaine to an undercover police officer and sentenced to 20 years and eight months in prison in 1994.

Aikens had developed a heavy cocaine habit and, by his own admission, was constantly using the drug from 1991 to 1994. Supposedly, a former lover tipped off the Kansas City, Missouri Police Department that Aikens was selling narcotics at his home. Consequently, in December , the police put Aikens' condominium under surveillance. The police observed numerous individuals entering Aikens' home and then exiting after a brief stay. On December 8, 1993, an undercover police officer named Ginger Locke approached Aikens standing in the garage of his condominium and asked for directions. After Aikens gave Locke directions, he told her that he was listed in the phone book and asked her to call him sometime. Locke called Aikens numerous times in order to establish a rapport with him. On January 18, 1994, Locke called Aikens and told him that she had loaned her car to a friend, and that the friend had been caught with some "stuff", referring to crack cocaine, in the car. Locke's story initiated a discussion about narcotics. Eventually, Aikens let Locke know that he could get her "all the stuff" she wanted.

Later that day, Locke drove to Aikens' home and asked him if she could buy an "eight ball", an eighth of an ounce of cocaine. Aikens asked Locke if she wanted her cocaine "hard", (crack form), or "soft", (powder form). She replied that she wanted it "hard." Aikens pointed to some crack cocaine sitting on an ottoman in his den and indicated that he did not have a full "eight ball" of crack on hand. He told Locke that he would have to make some more. Using equipment which he kept in his den, Aikens quickly proceeded to make crack by mixing powder cocaine with baking soda in a glass beaker, pouring water on it, heating it with a hand-held torch, baking it in a microwave, and then rinsing it with cold water. Aikens weighed some of the crack that he had made, along with some of the crack which he already possessed, on a dial-a-gram scale, and sold it to Locke for $200.

On January 24, 1994, Locke visited Aikens' home to buy more cocaine. Aikens had Locke drive him to his supplier's Kansas City home, where he used Locke's money to purchase powder cocaine. On the way back to Aikens' home, Aikens had Locke stop at stores where he could buy beakers and baking powder. When Aikens and Locke returned to Aikens' home, Aikens converted the powder cocaine into crack, and he sold the crack to Locke. On January 28 and February 23, Locke returned to Aikens' home and arranged to buy more crack. On each occasion, Aikens called a supplier and had Locke accompany him while he obtained powder cocaine. On each occasion, Aikens converted the powder into crack upon returning to his home and sold the crack cocaine to Locke.

Aikens was arrested on March 2, 1994, and after a March 17 mistrial, a grand jury indicted Aikens on four charges of crack cocaine distribution in violation of 21 U.S.C on March 25.

Because of the tougher federal guidelines for crack, he was sentenced as if he had sold  of powder cocaine. He received the maximum sentence of 15 years and eight months, and received an additional five years because he allegedly had a loaded gun in the room where the drugs were sold.

Life after prison
Aikens served his prison sentence in United States Penitentiary, Atlanta, and was scheduled to be released in 2012. He was released on June 4, 2008, three months after Congress approved new guidelines in the federal drug laws and made them retroactive. Hal McRae, the only former Royals teammate with whom Aikens corresponded while in prison, set Aikens up with a job in road construction, working in manholes.

Since his release, Aikens has spoken at schools about his experiences and to the Royals' young players, always hoping to return to baseball. In November 2008, he apologized to Royals fans and the people of Kansas City in the Kansas City Star.

On February 1, 2011, the Royals announced that they had hired Aikens as a minor league coach who will be based at the franchise's complex at Surprise, Arizona. The employment was delayed when his wife, Sara, suffered a stroke, believed to have been a complication of lupus.

Aikens has three daughters: Nicole and Sarita with Sara, and Lucia from a previous relationship.

References

Further reading

External links
, or Retrosheet, or Pelota Binaria (Venezuelan Winter League)

1954 births
African-American baseball players
American expatriate baseball players in Canada
American expatriate baseball players in Mexico
American people convicted of drug offenses
American sportspeople convicted of crimes
Angeles de Puebla players
Baseball players from South Carolina
Bradenton Explorers players
Bravos de León players
California Angels players
Cardenales de Lara players
American expatriate baseball players in Venezuela
Charros de Jalisco players
El Paso Diablos players
Industriales de Monterrey players
Kansas City Royals players
Living people
Major League Baseball first basemen
Major League Baseball players suspended for drug offenses
People from Seneca, South Carolina
Quad Cities Angels players
Salt Lake City Gulls players
St. Lucie Legends players
South Carolina State Bulldogs baseball players
South Carolina State Bulldogs football players
Syracuse Chiefs players
Tidewater Tides players
Tomateros de Culiacán players
Toronto Blue Jays players
Yaquis de Obregón players
21st-century African-American people
20th-century African-American sportspeople